The 1985 Badminton World Cup was the seventh edition of an international tournament Badminton World Cup. The event was held in Istora Senayan, Jakarta. Indonesia won 3 titles while China finished with the titles from 2 disciplines.

Medalists

Men's singles

Finals

Women's singles

Finals 
Ivana Lie defeated reigning World Champion Han Aiping (12–10, 11–7) in earlier round.

Men's doubles

Finals

Women's doubles

Finals

Mixed doubles

Finals

References 

 https://web.archive.org/web/20061214224943/http://tangkis.tripod.com/world/1985.htm
 Icuk lentur kegagahan wira M'sia
 Brilliant Icuk tames Frost

Badminton World Cup
1985 in badminton
1985 in Indonesian sport
Sports competitions in Jakarta
International sports competitions hosted by Indonesia